There are hundreds of breeds of the domestic pig (Sus scrofa domesticus).

List with classification and standards

See also

 List of sheep breeds
 List of goat breeds
 List of cattle breeds
 Lists of domestic animal breeds

References

 
 

 List
Pig